This is a list of lists of military commanders.

Asia

Philippines
 List of generals of Manila

China
 List of generals of the People's Republic of China

India
 List of generals of Ranjit Singh

Europe

France
 List of French generals of the Revolutionary and Napoleonic Wars
 List of French general officers (Peninsular War)

Lithuania
 List of generals of the Lithuanian Army

Portugal
 List of Portuguese general officers (Peninsular War)

Spain
 List of Spanish general officers (Peninsular War)

North America

United States
 List of American Civil War generals (Confederate)
 List of American Civil War generals (Acting Confederate)
 List of American Civil War generals (Union)
 List of American Civil War brevet generals (Union)
 List of female United States military generals and flag officers

South America

Brazil
 List of generals of the Empire of Brazil

Other lists

 
Lists of military lists